BSR may refer to:
 Backslash-R, a class of options in Perl Compatible Regular Expressions
 Basrah International Airport, IATA code
 Vasai Road railway station, Mumbai, India, station code
 Birmingham Sound Reproducers or BSR McDonald, a former UK audio manufacturer
 Bit Scan Reverse, find first set x86 instruction
 Bootstrap Router in Protocol Independent Multicast
 Brain stimulation reward
 The British School at Rome
 Brown Student/Community Radio, Providence, RI, US
 Brussels Sound Revolution, a Belgian new beat band, best known for the single Qui? (1989).